Agustín Pérez Soriano (28 August 1846, Valtierra, Navarra - 27 February 1907, Madrid) was a Spanish composer.

His best-known works are comic zarzuela including El guitarrico, premiered 12 October 1900 at the Teatro de la Zarzuela, Madrid.

References

1846 births
1907 deaths
Spanish composers
Spanish male composers
19th-century Spanish male musicians